The International Medieval Congress (IMC) is an annual academic conference held for scholars specializing in, or with an interest in, the study of the European Middle Ages (c. 300–1500). It is organised and administered by the Institute for Medieval Studies at the University of Leeds and is held in early July. The Congress is the largest annual conference in any subject in the UK, regularly attracting over 2000 registered participants, and has been used in some research as a barometer for trends in Medieval Studies generally. In 2020 and 2021 the conference was held online (branded as the vIMC) due to restrictions to manage the COVID-19 pandemic.

Aim, scope and participation
The main aim of the Congress is to provide an interdisciplinary forum for discussion on all aspects of the European Middle Ages (c. 300–1500). Each year's Congress has one special thematic strand which focuses on an area of interdisciplinary study in a wider context. However, this special thematic strand is not exclusive, and alongside it the IMC provides a platform of debate in all spheres of medieval research. For example, out of 450 sessions at the 2012 Congress, 160 were on that year's theme, "Rules to Follow (or Not)". Session and paper proposals are invited on all aspects of medieval studies, in any major European language.

Participants of the Congress range from senior scholars to postgraduate students, and interested members of the public such as members of the clergy or independent scholars. In 2012, 1751 participants attended from 42 countries; over 700 were from Europe beyond the UK and over 250 were from outside Europe. In recent years, Congress delegates come from over 50 countries.

Academic programme
The core of the IMC is its academic programme. On average, there are over 600 sessions taking place throughout the IMC, with more than 40 running simultaneously.

Anyone is welcome to propose a session or paper. Papers and sessions are proposed online, with the submissions period beginning in May of the previous year. The deadlines for submissions remain the same each year; 31 August for paper proposals and 30 September for session proposals the year before the relevant Congress.

Organisers of sessions can be individuals or a group of colleagues (post-graduate students, independent scholars, university departments, societies etc.), or a named individual acting on behalf of an academic society, university department, research project, a museum, a journal or publisher, etc.

The IMC has an international Programming Committee made up of 35 scholars with differing specialties who assess all submissions. They then group individual papers into sessions based upon common themes, along with accepting sessions. All abstracts are included in the IMC's online programme.

Participants are encouraged to organise session(s) with a balance of both young and established scholars, and with a geographical diversity, one or more being from mainland Europe. Each participant is only allowed to present one paper.

Keynote lectures
There are usually 5-8 keynote lectures throughout the Congress, with the first one opening the Congress, and the others taking place at lunchtimes or in the evenings.

Events and excursions
In addition to the academic programme, the IMC features a large number of events and excursions open to the public run by experts in their field. This includes the Making Leeds Medieval event, which takes place on the final day of the Congress every year on the University of Leeds campus. Each Congress also offers concerts, drama performances and a variety of hands-on workshops. Participants of the Congress also organise an annual football match and, since the move to Leeds University campus, this usually takes place on Woodhouse Moor.

Exhibitions and fairs
A book fair which features publishers that specialise in medieval studies runs from the Monday to the Thursday of the IMC. Many exhibitors offer special Congress discounts on their latest titles.

Since 2006 a two-day antiquarian and second-hand bookfair, has also been held which includes a number of smaller book dealers.

In recent years a one-day medieval craft fair has been held which includes replica crafts, in addition to crafts inspired by the Middle Ages.

A one-day historical and archaeological societies’ fair is also held year on year which allows smaller, often local to the area, societies the opportunity to promote their work.

Publications
Since its inception, the IMC has been the basis for a book series published by Brepols named International Medieval Research. This publishes themed collections of peer-reviewed papers based on papers given at the IMC; as of 2018 the series had published twenty-four volumes and its general editor is the Congress director, Axel Müller.

History
In 1988, Simon Forde succeeded Catherine R. E. Coutts as the editor of the International Medieval Bibliography, becoming deputy director of the Leeds Centre for Medieval Studies the next year. His colleagues at the Bibliography on his arrival were Ian N. Wood (one of the School of History’s academic staff, as Consulting Editor) and two clerical staff, Elizabeth Firth and Sandra Harvey. The director of the Leeds Centre for Medieval Studies was then the archaeologist Lawrence A. S. Butler (1934–2014), and the deputy director Lesley Johnson (1957–). In 1989, the Bibliography team gained Alan V. Murray as Assistant Editor; the historian Wendy Childs took over as director of the Centre; and Forde became the deputy director, putting him in influential roles in both of the key Medieval Studies institutions at the University. This arrangement remained stable through to 1996, with the addition in 1992 of two postgraduate editorial assistants, Rachel Kilby and Keren Wick, to the Bibliography team in 1990–92.

In 1990–92, via the Centre for Medieval Studies, this team hosted three annual conferences and, in 1991, a session at the Kalamazoo International Medieval Congress on Medieval Studies, all on 'concepts of nationality and national identity' — a topic characteristic of Medieval Studies’ challenging of nationalist historiographies in that period. In Forde’s recollection,in 1992 [recte 1991], Lesley Johnson, Wendy Childs, and I went together to Kalamazoo — I’ve been going every year since 1986, but it was the first time Lesley and Wendy had been. In those days, it was a bit of a pilgrimage for British scholars. On the way back from Manchester airport, somewhere on the M62, we started thinking: why can’t we do a conference like Kalamazoo over here? We spoke to colleagues from the Central European University, as well as contacts at Leeds and across Europe — there seemed to be support for such a venture.The International Medieval Congress was first held in 1994 with a total participation of 859 delegates, in part to celebrate the 25th anniversary of the International Medieval Bibliography, and in part to commemorate the 1400th anniversary of Gregory of Tours (although papers on all aspects of Medieval Studies were encouraged). The Congress was conceived as a European equivalent to the annual International Congress on Medieval Studies at Kalamazoo, Michigan, begun in the 1960s.

An International Medieval Institute was formed within Leeds's School of History in 1995 to accommodate the International Medieval Bibliography, the Congress, and their burgeoning (if largely fixed-term) staff.

From its inception, the Congress has been managed by a standing committee of medievalists at Leeds. The peer-review and organising of the programme was in time handed over to a much larger programming committee of scholars representing a diverse range of specialisms around the world. One of the postgraduate helpers at the 1994 Congress, Axel Müller, became Congress Assistant for the 1995 event and over time became the IMC director, a position which, as of 2019, he still holds. In 2021, Müller, became the first non-North American recipient of the Robert L. Kindrick–CARA Award for Outstanding Service to Medieval Studies from the Medieval Academy of America.

In 2020, the COVID-19 pandemic led to the cancellation of the in-person conference and it was replaced by an online event on the same date. The 2021 conference will also be an online only event.

Venue 
From 1994 to 2012, the IMC took place at Bodington Hall, a university hall of residence, and the adjacent Weetwood Hall, a university-owned hotel and conference centre.

From 2013, the Congress was held on the campus of the University of Leeds. From that time, the Congress has grown to an average of well over 2000 participants each year. It has also become an important part of the medievalist calendar as it offers a European alternative to the International Congress on Medieval Studies, which is held in Kalamazoo, MI, USA.

Themes 
Each year, the Congress has included a special thematic focus in addition to papers on Medieval Studies in general. Often the theme is linked to a relevant anniversary. Thematic Strands to date are:

1994: Gregory of Tours; commemorating the 1400th anniversary of the death of Gregory of Tours
1995: Crusades; commemorating the 800th anniversary of the inception of the first Crusade (1095)
1996: Warfare; celebrating the opening of the Royal Armouries Museum in Leeds
1997: Conversion; commemorating the 1400th anniversary of the landing of St. Augustine in Kent in 597
1998: Settlements; commemorating the 50th anniversary of the re-discovery of Wharram Percy through Maurice Beresford in 1948
1999: Saints; aimed to promote interdisciplinary contacts between those working on all the different aspects of saints’ studies
2000: Time and Eternity; commemorating the millennium in a wider context.
2001: Familia and Domus
2002: Exile; commemorating the 700th anniversary of the final expulsion of Dante from Florence
2003: Power and Authority; marking to mark the 700th anniversary of Boniface VIII's publication of the bull “Unam Sanctam”
2004: Clash of Cultures, marking the 800th anniversary of the capture of Constantinople by the 4th Crusade
2005 Youth and Age
2006 Emotion and Gesture
2007 The Medieval City, celebrating the 800th anniversary of the creation of the borough of Leeds.
2008 The Natural World
2009 Heresy and Orthodoxy, marking the beginning of the Albigensian Crusade
2010 Travel and Exploration, marking the 550th anniversary of the death of prince Henry ‘The Navigator’
2011 Poor...Rich
2012 Rules to Follow (or Not)
2013 Pleasure
2014 Empire
2015 Reform & Renewal
2016 Food, Feast & Famine
2017 Otherness
2018 Memory
2019 Materialities
2020 Borders (the first virtual IMC, following cancellation of the in-person IMC due to the COVID-19 pandemic. The vIMC attracted the usual number of attendees, 3200, with over 400 papers given alongside a virtual bookfair, craft fair, and conference disco.
2021 Climates
2022 Borders (theme repeated due to the COVID-19 pandemic)
2023 Networks & Entanglements

Controversy
The 2017 Congress took place shortly after the US election of Donald Trump and the UK's referendum vote to leave the European Union, which were characterised by growing political use of medievalism by far-right political movements. The Congress theme that year was 'otherness', and rising tensions in the field of medieval studies regarding the subject's complicity in white supremacy 'came to a head' at the Congress. In particular, the event drew criticism because all its plenary speakers on the theme were white men. Moreover, one chair of a plenary session made what Geraldine Heng has characterised as 'a racial joke trivializing skin color'. Specifically, according to The Chronicle of Higher Education, he joked that 'if audience members thought he was just another old, white man, they should just wait until after his holiday at the beach'. One expression of criticism came in the form of an open letter by Ayanna Thompson of the Shakespeare Association of America, which by October 2017 had been signed by nearly 950 people. The Congress issued official apologies, including in its August newsletter, stating 'we are committed to creating an open, accessible, and inclusive environment. We also take the principles of dignity and mutual respect very seriously, and we are sorry for any offence caused by comments made during the introduction to Monday's opening lecture. We are determined to create and encourage a positive, inclusive event for all medievalists to enjoy', adding that 'we are listening to the complex and ongoing discussions surrounding both the IMC and medieval studies as a whole. As part of our review to improve the IMC each year, we have been discussing plans to develop the diversity of the Congress and encourage and support medievalists from under-represented groups'. In Heng's assessment, 'after the cultural trauma inflicted by the conference, fraught conversations on "the whiteness of medieval studies" ignited on both sides of the Atlantic ... Who gets to speak for scholarship on the Middle Ages, and for medievalists ... is now a heated question to be taken up at panels planned for several conferences in 2018'.

See also
 Conferences in Medieval Studies

References

External links

 International Medieval Congress
 Institute for Medieval Studies
 University of Leeds
 Archive of newsletters 2006-18
 International Medieval Congress IMC 2022
 
Medieval studies